The Mobile Company of America was an American steam automobile manufacturer founded in 1899 by John Brisben Walker with production in Tarrytown, New York.

History 
John Brisben Walker arranged the purchase of F. E. Stanley and F. O. Stanley's manufacturing rights and factory for their steam carriage demonstrated in 1898.  With Amzi L. Barber, they set-up the Locomobile Company of America in 1899 to produce steam carriages.  Almost immediately, Brisben Walker and Lorenzo Barber parted ways and split the company in two. Walker set up the Mobile Company of America with the right to the Stanley patents but no factory, while the Locomobile Company shared the patent rights but also received the Stanley Watertown factory and most of the steam cars under production.

Brisben Walker purchased a factory site near Tarrytown, New York and hired McKim, Mead & White to design a purpose built automobile factory.  Manufacturing machinery was purchased and the new factory at Kingsland Point produced its first Mobile Steam carriage on March 7, 1900. Advertising claimed it to be the largest automobile factory in the world.

Mobile's version of the steam carriage had a 5 to 12 horsepower engine, with a water tank range of about 35 miles and a gasoline tank range of between 60 to 75 miles. In 1901 kerosene could replace gasoline for fuel. Originally built as a light runabout, Mobile added up to 24 styles of bodies to improve poor sales. By 1902, a top speed of 50 mph was claimed. Prices for the Model 4 runabout started at $750 rising to a 9 passenger "coupe" Model 50 at $3,000.

The Automobile Races held at Newport, Rhode Island in September 1900 featured a steam vehicle race won by Joseph H. McDuffee driving the Mobile. Earlier in 1900, Brisben Walker with his wife, drove a Mobile steam carriage up Pikes Peak to the timberline or approximately 10,000 feet.  

Advertising for the Mobile Company was taken out in most major magazines and as Brisben Walker was the publisher of Cosmopolitan Magazine, the Mobile Company of America featured prominently in it.  Mobile's new factory was expected to produce 20 steam carriages weekly.  By the fall of 1901, production was averaging 5 steam carriages a week. Locomobile built approximately 5,000 steam runabouts over three years. Mobile, being slower to market, built an estimated 600.  In early 1903, the Mobile Company of America stopped production.  Later in 1903, the equipped automobile plant at Kingsland Point was leased to Maxwell-Briscoe.

Gallery

See also
Locomobile Company of America
Amzi L. Barber

References

Defunct motor vehicle manufacturers of the United States
Motor vehicle manufacturers based in New York (state)
Vehicle manufacturing companies established in 1899
1899 establishments in New York (state)
Vehicle manufacturing companies disestablished in 1903
1903 disestablishments in New York (state)
Steam cars
1900s cars
Veteran vehicles
Cars introduced in 1899